"L'Inconnu sur la Terre" is an essay written  by French Nobel laureate J. M. G. Le Clézio.

Subject 
The essay is described by the author as being a long journal written on Italian schoolbooks of a young boy's erratic walkabout on the soil, though not far from the sea, somewhat lost in the fog, and who particularly likes the intensive light of day.

Publication history

Nouvelle Revue Française:I. 

"L'inconnu sur la terre." I.Nouvelle Revue Française 299, déc: 1–21,1977

Nouvelle Revue Française:II. 

"L'inconnu sur la terre." II.Nouvelle Revue Française 300, janvier: 46–64.1978

Nouvelle Revue Française:fin. 

"L'inconnu sur la terre." fin. Nouvelle Revue Française 301, fév: 70–84.
1978

First French Edition

References 

1978 essays
Essays by J. M. G. Le Clézio
Works by J. M. G. Le Clézio